The 1999 Three Rivers District Council election was held on 6 May 1999. The whole council was up for election with boundary changes since the last election in 1998. The Liberal Democrat party gained overall control of the council from no overall control.

Election result

References
1999 Three Rivers election result

1999
1999 English local elections
1990s in Hertfordshire